The 1982 Grand Prix motorcycle racing season was the 34th F.I.M. Road Racing World Championship season.

Season summary
Italian Franco Uncini on the Roberto Gallina backed Suzuki took a well-earned championship for Roberto Gallina's Italian Suzuki team in the 500cc class.

Yamaha introduced a new motorcycle with a V4 engine for Kenny Roberts but, suffered from having to develop a new bike during the season. Roberts was also now using Dunlop tires after Goodyear withdrew from motorcycle racing. Honda abandoned its NR500 four-stroke in favor of a V3 two-stroke NS500 piloted by American newcomer, Freddie Spencer, defending champion Marco Lucchinelli and veteran Takazumi Katayama. Spencer would give Honda its first 500cc win since the 1967 season and its first with a two-stroke. Roberts injured a finger and a knee at the British Grand Prix and would miss the remainder of the season. Barry Sheene was lying third in the championship, tied on points with Roberts after eight rounds however, his season was brought to a premature end while testing the new Yamaha V4. He hit the obscured fallen machine of Frenchman Patrick Igoa during practice at Silverstone and badly broke both legs and an arm. Most of the factory sponsored riders boycotted the French round at Nogaro in protest of the unsafe track conditions.

Anton Mang successfully defended his 350 title for Kawasaki despite winning only one race. He would be the final 350 world champion as the class would be discontinued after 1982. Mang lost his 250 crown to Jean-Louis Tournadre by one point despite winning five races. Tournadre's only victory would be at the boycotted French round. The Frenchman would become France's first world champion. Angel Nieto clinched his eleventh title in the 125 class on a Garelli. In the 50cc class, Eugenio Lazzarini and Stefan Dörflinger traded wins, each rider winning three races, but Dörflinger took the title because of his three second-place finishes.

1982 Grand Prix season calendar
The following Grands Prix were scheduled to take place in 1982:

Calendar changes
 The German Grand Prix was moved back, from 3 May to 26 September.
 The French Grand Prix moved from the Paul Ricard circuit to the Circuit de Nogaro.
 The Nations Grand Prix moved from the Autodromo Nazionale Monza to the Circuito Internazionale Santa Monica.
 The Yugoslavian Grand Prix was moved back, from 31 May to 18 July.
 The San Marino Grand Prix was moved back, from 12 July to 5 September.
 The San Marino Grand Prix moved from the Autodromo Dino Ferrari to the Autodromo Internazionale del Mugello.

Results and standings

1982 Grand Prix season results

500cc riders' standings
Scoring system
Points are awarded to the top ten finishers. A rider has to finish the race to earn points.
 

{|
|

350cc standings

250cc standings

125cc standings

50cc standings

Bibliography
 Büla, Maurice & Schertenleib, Jean-Claude (2001). Continental Circus 1949-2000. Chronosports S.A.

References

External links

Grand Prix motorcycle racing seasons
Grand Prix motorcycle racing season